The Outfit is a 1973 American neo-noir crime film directed by John Flynn. It stars Robert Duvall, Karen Black, Joe Don Baker and Robert Ryan.

Flynn's screenplay is an adaptation of the novel of the same name by Richard Stark, pseudonym of Donald E. Westlake. It features a character modeled on Stark's fictional character Parker, who was introduced in The Hunter.

Plot 
A  pair of hitmen (one dressed as a priest) drive to Eddie Macklin's house and kill him as he builds a brick wall in his backyard. Eddie's brother Earl is released from prison in Illinois after a 27-month term for carrying a concealed weapon. His girlfriend Bett picks him up and takes him to a motel. She informs Earl of his brother's execution by the Outfit. Earl realises that the motel stay is a setup, and when one of the hitmen who killed his brother bursts into the room, Earl ambushes him and tortures him for information.

Macklin lets the hitman live and sends him back to Chicago as a warning. Bett confesses that the Outfit tortured her and threatened to cut her face up if she didn't lure Earl to the motel. His next move is to rob a poker game where Outfit member Jake Menner is playing. Menner explains that the bank that Eddie and Earl robbed together was an Outfit cover, so the contract on the two of them is simple retribution. Macklin calculates that the Outfit owes him $250,000 for the trouble it has caused him. He says whatever he earns by ripping off the Outfit's operations in the meantime is just gravy. Then, he shoots Menner in the hand as revenge for the treatment of Bett.

Menner tells his boss Mailer that the Outfit has a problem, but Mailer insists that it is Menner's problem to solve. The hitmen who killed Eddie are sent to kill Macklin's old partner Cody at a diner that he owns. Cody gets them to leave by pointing out that the town sheriff is there; then he and Macklin hatch a plan to keep robbing the Outfit, using Bett as a driver. Their next target is a dive restaurant that does not even have a safe. On their way out with the money, the cook throws his cleaver at Cody and three gunmen lie in wait outside the restaurant. Bett mows two of them down and the trio escapes.

Macklin and Cody go to Chemey to get a new car, since theirs has been made. Chemey's sister-in-law makes a pass at Cody. When he turns her down, she claims that he tried to rape her. That causes a physical confrontation that Chemey manages to deflate, allowing Cody and Macklin to leave in their new car.

Their next target is a much bigger operation. Cody poses as a mailman, and Macklin as a maintenance man. They knock out a secretary and make their way into a warren of back rooms where they rob the safe. Macklin and Cody then corner Mailer at a horse auction. He amiably agrees to pay the $250,000, but he warns Macklin to stop knocking off his businesses.

Mailer is furious that Macklin was able to be "close enough to touch" him. He orders him killed. At the payoff, Macklin quickly realizes it is a setup and that the briefcase is filled with newspaper instead of money. He and Cody manage to escape by tripping a fire alarm, enraging Mailer further.

Cody and Macklin plan an assault on Mailer's well-guarded home. Cody warns that it will be easy to get in but nearly impossible to get out. They hijack one of the Outfit's cars and use it to get past the gates. Inside the house, Cody plants a bomb under a table. The duo goes upstairs to hunt for Mailer, who spies Cody in his shaving mirror. He manages to ambush Cody, shooting him in the gut. Macklin is waiting for Mailer in the hallway—the still-conscious Cody shoots Mailer in the back, then Macklin finishes Mailer.

Once the bomb goes off, Macklin puts on a white medical coat and helps Cody out of the house. The police, fire department, and an ambulance have arrived. Posing as a medic, Macklin puts Cody into the back of an ambulance, and they laugh about how easy it was to escape.

Cast 

 Robert Duvall as Earl Macklin
 Karen Black as Bett Harrow
 Joe Don Baker as Cody
 Robert Ryan as Mailer
 Timothy Carey as Menner
 Richard Jaeckel as Chemey
 Sheree North as Buck's Wife
 Tom Reese as Hit Man
 Felice Orlandi as Frank Orlandi
 Marie Windsor as Madge Coyle
 Jane Greer as Alma
 Henry Jones as Doctor
 Joanna Cassidy as Rita
 Elisha Cook as Carl

Production
John Flynn had been a long time fan of the Parker novels. Contrary to rumors, Flynn claimed the film was always intended to be set in the present day and not in the 1940s. Despite the fact that James T. Aubrey, head of Metro-Goldwyn-Mayer wanted the ending changed to make it more upbeat, Flynn remained very fond of the movie.

Reception 
Roger Ebert gave the film three-and-a-half stars out of four and praised it as "a classy action picture, very well directed and acted." However, Time wrote "Director Flynn makes a movie that has been seen before, without either the skill or spirit that distinguished such excellent predecessors as Point Blank and Get Carter." In his review for The New York Times, Vincent Canby wrote "The Outfit is not really a bad movie. It doesn't fail in an attempt to do something beyond its means. It doesn't attempt to do anything except pass the time, which simply isn't good enough when most of us have access to television."

The Outfit (much like The Friends of Eddie Coyle and other crime films of this period) has been included on many lists of lesser known films recommended by 21st century film analysts.

Quentin Tarantino has a chapter on the movie in his 2022 book Cinema Speculation.

See also
 List of American films of 1973

References

External links 
 
 
 
 

1973 films
Films based on American novels
Films based on crime novels
Films based on works by Donald E. Westlake
Films directed by John Flynn
Films scored by Jerry Fielding
American crime thriller films
Films about the Chicago Outfit
Metro-Goldwyn-Mayer films
American neo-noir films
1970s English-language films
1970s American films